Feyerabend is a German surname. Notable people with the surname include:
 Gerhard Feyerabend, German WWII general in the Wehrmacht
 Henry Feyerabend, Adventist evangelist, singer, and author
 Markus Feyerabend, glider aerobatic pilot
 Paul Karl Feyerabend, 20th century Austrian philosopher of science
 Sigmund Feyerabend, printer

German-language surnames